Liana Mesa Luaces (born December 26, 1977 in Camagüey) is a volleyball player from Cuba, who represented her native country at the 2004 Summer Olympics in Athens, Greece. There she won the bronze medal with the national team in the women's team competition. Liana signed for volleyball club "Red Star" Belgrade, Serbia on 2 February 2009.

Clubs
  Crvena zvezda (2009–2010)

References

External links
 FIVB Profile

1977 births
Living people
Cuban women's volleyball players
Volleyball players at the 2004 Summer Olympics
Volleyball players at the 2008 Summer Olympics
Olympic bronze medalists for Cuba
Olympic volleyball players of Cuba
Olympic medalists in volleyball
Volleyball players at the 2003 Pan American Games
Volleyball players at the 2007 Pan American Games
Pan American Games silver medalists for Cuba
Pan American Games gold medalists for Cuba
Sportspeople from Camagüey
Medalists at the 2004 Summer Olympics
Pan American Games medalists in volleyball
Central American and Caribbean Games silver medalists for Cuba
Competitors at the 2006 Central American and Caribbean Games
Liberos
Central American and Caribbean Games medalists in volleyball
Medalists at the 2003 Pan American Games
Medalists at the 2007 Pan American Games